Thomas M. McGee (born December 15, 1955) is a former mayor of Lynn, Massachusetts. Previously, he served as a Massachusetts state senator for the Third Essex district. He is a Democrat.

Early life and education 
McGee was born on December 15, 1955, in Lynn, Massachusetts as the son of Thomas W. McGee, former speaker of the Massachusetts House of Representatives (1975–1984).

Career 
McGee was chairman of the Senate Labor and Workforce Development Committee, the Joint Public Service Committee, and the Joint Children's Caucus. Prior to serving in the Senate, he was an attorney who served as a state representative from 1995 to 2002. McGee was elected Chairman of the Massachusetts Democratic Party on October 17, 2013.

Mayor of Lynn 
In 2017 McGee he was elected mayor of Lynn defeating incumbent mayor Judith Flanagan Kennedy in a landslide. The Mayor also serves as the Chairperson for the Lynn School Committee for Lynn Public Schools.

Personal life 
McGee is married and lives in Lynn with his wife, Maria, and their children, Thomas and Katherine.

References

1955 births
Massachusetts Democratic Party chairs
Democratic Party Massachusetts state senators
Democratic Party members of the Massachusetts House of Representatives
New England Law Boston alumni
Politicians from Lynn, Massachusetts
University of Massachusetts Lowell alumni
Living people
21st-century American politicians